Come On Down! is an album by American jazz saxophonist Eddie Harris recorded in 1970 and released on the Atlantic label.

Reception

The Allmusic review called the album "a romping soul/jazz/rock session... a bit overloaded on the electric guitar side, but invigorating".

Though uncredited, Hot Chocolate's 1971 hit single "You Could Have Been a Lady" borrows heavily from album closer and 1970 single "Why Don't You Quit", lifting its entire melody and other elements.

Track listing
All compositions by Eddie Harris except where noted.
 "Don't You Know Your Future's in Space" - 5:29 
 "Live Right Now" - 8:23 
 "Really" - 4:35 
 "Nowhere to Go" - 5:36 
 "Fooltish" (Sonny Phillips) - 7:10 
 "Why Don't You Quit" - 6:47

Personnel
Eddie Harris - tenor saxophone, varitone
Ira Sullivan - trumpet
Dave Crawford - piano
Billy Carter - organ
Cornell Dupree, Jimmy O'Rourke (tracks 1, 2 & 4-6), Joe Diorio (track 3) - guitar
Donald "Duck" Dunn - electric bass
Tubby Ziegler - drums

References 

Eddie Harris albums
1970 albums
Atlantic Records albums
Albums produced by Tom Dowd